Scissurella maraisorum is a species of minute sea snail, a marine gastropod mollusk in the family Scissurellidae. The holotype is NMSA W3498/T1616.

Description

Distribution

References

 Geiger D.L. (2006). Eight new species of Scissurellidae and Anatomidae (Mollusca: Gastropoda: Vetigastropoda) from around the world, with discussion of two senior synonyms. Zootaxa 1128:1–33.
 Geiger D.L. (2012) Monograph of the little slit shells. Volume 1. Introduction, Scissurellidae. pp. 1–728. Volume 2. Anatomidae, Larocheidae, Depressizonidae, Sutilizonidae, Temnocinclidae. pp. 729–1291. Santa Barbara Museum of Natural History Monographs Number 7

Scissurellidae
Gastropods described in 2006